The 7th Cabinet of the Union of South Africa, the 3rd formed by General J. B. M. Hertzog, was in power from 17 May 1933 to 18 May 1938.

Cabinet

Sources

Government of South Africa
Executive branch of the government of South Africa
Cabinets of South Africa
1933 establishments in South Africa
1938 disestablishments in South Africa
Cabinets established in 1933
Cabinets disestablished in 1938